Daphne caucasica is a shrub, of the family Thymelaeaceae.  It is evergreen, and is native to the Caucasus.

Description
The shrub grows to a height 3 to 6 feet.  It tends to grow small and rounded.  It has small white flowers that grow in clusters, and yellow or brown fruit.  It flowers mostly from May to June, and to a smaller degree after June through frost.

References

caucasica